Arrival of Tongkin Train, also referred to as Arrival of Train, Tien-Tsin, is a 1901 documentary silent film showing the arrival of a train in Tianjin, China. The film was made by American Mutoscope and Biograph Company.

See also
 List of American films of 1901
American Mutoscope and Biograph Company

References

External links

Mutoscope and Biograph

1901 films
American silent short films
1900s English-language films

American documentary films
American black-and-white films
Documentary films about rail transport
1900s documentary films
Black-and-white documentary films
Documentary films about China
1900s American films